Belenören can refer to:

 Belenören, Keles
 Belenören, Nallıhan